The Ayum Forest Reserve is found in the Asunafo South District in the Brong Ahafo Region of Ghana. It was established in 1940. This site is 112 km.

It is connected to the Subim Reserve and the Bonsam Bepo Reserve, and together they cover about 488 square kilometers. It plays a key role in conserving biodiversity in Guinean Moist Forest Eco-Region. The area contains a small number of chimpanzees, elephants and other endangered species.

References

External links
 A.P.E.S Wiki
Satellite view

Protected areas established in 1940
Forest reserves of Ghana